was a village located in Kamiminochi District, Nagano Prefecture, Japan.

As of 2003, the village had an estimated population of 2,140 and a density of 15.85 persons per km². The total area was 134.99 km².

On January 1, 2005, Kinasa, along with the village of Ōoka (from Sarashina District), the town of Toyono, and the village of Togakushi (all from Kamiminochi District), was merged into the expanded city of Nagano.

Dissolved municipalities of Nagano Prefecture
Nagano (city)